Citizens of the Czech Republic is a minor Czech political party.

References

External links
 Official party program (in Czech)

Centrist political parties in the Czech Republic
Political parties established in 2013